The , or JRTT,  is an Independent Administrative Institution created by an Act of the National Diet, effective October 1, 2003. JRTT was founded by integrating the Japan Railway Construction Public Corporation (JRCC) and the Corporation for Advanced Transport and Technology (CATT).

Lines of business
As its name implies, JRTT is involved in construction and technical support for railway and other transportation projects throughout Japan. JRTT has undertaken numerous railway construction projects during its existence, including:

 Nagoya Subway Meijo Line (2004)
 Kyushu Shinkansen (2004)
 Meitetsu Airport Line (2005)
 Tsukuba Express (2005)
 Osaka Higashi Line (2008)
 Tokyo Metro Fukutoshin Line (2009)
 Narita Sky Access Line (2010)

JRTT is currently working on construction of the Hokuriku Shinkansen and Hokkaido Shinkansen high-speed rail projects, as well as the Eastern Kanagawa Line project.

In addition to its railway construction projects, JRTT has also sponsored maritime research, including the latest ship used as the JR Miyajima Ferry.

JRTT also performs administrative functions related to the liquidation of the Japanese National Railways, such as management of JNR employee pensions.

Subsidiaries
JRTT is currently the parent entity of the following JR Group companies:

 Hokkaido Railway Company
 Shikoku Railway Company
 Japan Freight Railway Company

In 2011, the National Diet passed legislation requiring JRTT to use its retained earnings from other businesses for the purpose of Shinkansen construction and capital expenditures at its subsidiary railway companies.

JRTT was also a shareholder of the West Japan Railway Company and Central Japan Railway Company before offering those shares to the public. (The East Japan Railway Company was privatized shortly before JRTT was founded.)

External links
 JRTT

Railway Construction, Transport and Technology Agency
Railway Construction, Transport and Technology Agency
Railway infrastructure companies
Government agencies established in 2003
2003 establishments in Japan